Hylaeorchis is a genus of epiphytic orchids. There is only one known species, Hylaeorchis petiolaris, native to northwestern South America (Colombia, Guyana, Venezuela, Ecuador, Peru, northern Brazil).

References

Monotypic Epidendroideae genera
Maxillarieae
Orchids of South America
Maxillariinae